Alder's End is a small village in Herefordshire, England. It is about 8 miles (13 km) east of Hereford and is near the A438 road. The village falls within the Tarrington parish.

References

Villages in Herefordshire